Kiana Madeira (born November 4, 1992) is a Canadian actress. She starred as Moe in the Netflix television series Trinkets. Madeira played Deena in the 2021 Netflix horror film trilogy Fear Street.

Early life 
Madeira was born in Toronto, Ontario, and grew up in Mississauga, Ontario. She is of Portuguese descent on her father's side and of Irish, First Nations, and Black Canadian descent on her mother's side. She became interested in acting at the age of 5, after becoming infatuated with John Travolta in Grease.

Career 
In February 2019, Madeira was cast in the lead role of Deena in the Fear Street trilogy films which were released on Netflix in July 2021. In June 2021, it was announced that she will star in a romance-action movie entitled Perfect Addiction opposite Ross Butler.

Personal life 
In 2017, Madeira began dating actor Lovell Adams-Gray; they became engaged in 2021. She moved to the United States in 2017 for her acting career, but frequently visits Canada and her family. Madeira is a practicing Christian.

Filmography

Film

Television

References

External links 

1992 births
Living people
20th-century Canadian actresses
Actresses from Toronto
Black Canadian actresses
Canadian child actresses
Canadian Christians
Canadian expatriates in the United States
Canadian film actresses
Canadian television actresses
Canadian people of First Nations descent
Canadian people of Irish descent
Canadian people of Portuguese descent